Oda of Brabant (also called Oda of Anderlues; 1134–1158) was a Belgian prioress of the 12th century, commonly revered as a saint.

Life
Oda was born to a noble family from the Brabant region of Belgium. In order to avoid an arranged marriage to a young nobleman, she disfigured her face. Her family then allowed her to follow the religious vocation she desired. She became a Premonstratensian nun at Rivroelles, eventually becoming prioress there.

Veneration
Although Oda's cultus has never been formally confirmed, popular devotion continues. Her feast day is 20 April.

References

1134 births
1158 deaths
Belgian beatified people
Premonstratensian nuns
12th-century venerated Christians
12th-century Christian nuns
People from Hainaut (province)